The  is a museum located in Karatsu, Saga Prefecture, Japan, dedicated to the , a National Historic Site acclaimed as "Japan's first paddy".

See also
 Yayoi period
 Saga Prefectural Museum
 List of Historic Sites of Japan (Saga)
 Karatsu Castle
 Kawamura Art Museum

References

External links
  Matsurokan

Archaeological museums in Japan
History museums in Japan
Museums in Saga Prefecture
Karatsu, Saga
Yayoi period